The Scorpion ZS-256 (ru: Скорпион ЗС-256) was a very widespread ZX Spectrum clone produced in St. Petersburg by Sergey Zonov (same person behind the "Leningrad" clone). 

Introduced in 1992, it was fitted with a Zilog Z80B processor, a  AY-3-8910 sound chip, whilst RAM memory options ranged from 256 to 1024 KB.

The computer was usually assembled in a mini tower configuration with a standard IBM power supply, allowing the connection of peripherals, drives, etc. Various expansions were produced, including SMUC – an adapter for IDE and ISA slots, which allowed the use of IBM PC compatible hard drives and expansion cards.

The Shadow Service Monitor (debugger) in the BASIC ROM was activated by pressing the Magic Button (NMI). There was also the option of fitting the machine with a ProfROM which included such software as a clock, hard disk utilities, and the ZX-Word text editor. The computer can work with TR-DOS, CP/M and IS-DOS systems.

In 1996, the Scorpion ZS-256 Turbo+ version was introduced, featuring a "turbo" mode (7 MHz instead of the original's 3.50 MHz), IDE hard drive, 101-key PC type keyboard, 3.5 floppy disc drive and a XTR modem (allowing access to ZX Net and FidoNet).

A version of the mainboard called GMX (Graphic Memory eXpander) comes with 2MB of RAM and can emulate other clones like the Pentagon 128. It has new graphics modes: 640 x 200 with 16 colors; 80x25 character text mode.

Production of Spectrum-compatible computers ceased in 1998, with the Scorpion company focusing on the sale of IBM PC-compatibles and office equipment.

Versions 

 Scorpion ZS-256 (1992)
 Scorpion ZS-256 Turbo+ (1996)

Upgrades from the original ZX Spectrum 48/128K 

 RAM ranging from 256 KB to 2 MB
 ROM ranging from 64 to 512 KB;
 Additional GMX video modes: 640 x 200 with 16 colors; 80 x 25 character text mode.
 Optional CMOS with persistent real-time clock
 IDE Controller for hard drives
 "Turbo Mode" that clocks the CPU up to 7 MHz
 Shadow Service Monitor (debugger) in ROM
 AY8910/12 sound chip
 Built-in printer interface (Centronics and RS232C);
 IBM PC keyboard and mouse controller
 TR-DOS, CP/M and IS-DOS systems
 Built-in XTR modem (ZX Net, FidoNet)

References 

ZX Spectrum clones
Computer-related introductions in 1992